The Salle Gaveau, named after the French piano maker Gaveau, is a classical concert hall in Paris, located at 45-47 rue La Boétie, in the 8th arrondissement of Paris. It is particularly intended for chamber music.

Construction 
The plans for the hall were drawn up by Jacques Hermant in 1905, the year the land was acquired. The construction of the Gaveau building took place from 1906 to 1907. The vocation of this hall was chamber music from the beginning, and its seating capacity was a thousand, just as it is today. The hall was home to a large organ built in 1900 by the Cavaillé-Coll|Mutin-Cavaillé-Coll firm. This instrument with 39 stops (8 on the positive, 12 on the recitative, 12 on the grand organ and 7 on the pedal) was subsequently installed in 1957 in the commune of Saint-Saëns in Normandy. The hall is a concert venue renowned for its exceptional acoustics.

Beginnings 
The hall opened its doors on 3 October 1907 for the concert of the Lehrergesangverein (Teachers' Choir of the city of Bremen with one hundred and forty performers). It immediately became a prestigious hall. Camille Saint-Saëns' concert in the Salle Gaveau [audience and orchestra from the stage]; then other famous musicians gave concerts there from the first months after the opening. The concerts Lamoureux, conducted by Camille Chevillard, Vincent d'Indy and André Messager, moved to Gaveau. On 5, 8 and 12 November 1907, Alfred Cortot, Jacques Thibaud and Pablo Casals performed the complete trios by Beethoven. In the following years, the Salle Gaveau hosted Eugène Ysaÿe (21 January 1908), Lazare-Lévy (27 January 1909), Marguerite Long (11 December 1911), Georges Enesco (8 February 1912), Fritz Kreisler (21 and 28 April 1912), Wilhelm Backhaus (15 May 1912), Claude Debussy (5 May 1917).

World Wars 
During the First World War, the Salle Gaveau was used to give shows to soldiers and victims. However, it continued its original activity. During the interwar period, the hall hosted Charles Munch (28 October 1933), Wanda Landowska (7 November 1933), Rudolf Serkin (2 December 1933), and Yves Nat in 1934. The Lamoureux concerts continued to be held there.

The same scenario occurred during the Second World War, when Gaveau was once again used as a gala venue, while hosting famous musicians such as Jacques Février, Pierre Fournier, Samson François, Paul Tortelier, and Raymond Trouard. The concert season continued after the war. In 1955, for example, the hall welcomed Reine Flachot, Pierre Bernac, Francis Poulenc, and Alexandre Lagoya.

Purchase by the Fournier couple 
In 1963, Gaveau went bankrupt. This led to the sale of the Gaveau building to an insurance company, and it was destined to be destroyed for the construction of a car park. Chantal and Jean-Marie Fournier, a couple of passionate musicians, bought the hall in 1976.

In 1982, the house was listed in the inventory and then classified as a Historic Monument in 1992. Chantal and Jean-Marie Fournier then sought to have it restored, the condition of the venue gradually declining. Subsidies were obtained, and the work was carried out by Alain-Charles Perrot the chief architect of the Monuments Historiques. The hall reopened on 8 January 2001. It was restored in a more sober way than before, i.e. by seeking to recover the colours and ornaments of 1907.

Works premiered at Salle Gaveau 

 Ravel: Valses Nobles et Sentimentales for piano, in 1911
 Vierne: Troisième Symphonie (with Marcel Dupré organ), in 1912 
 Ravel: Piano Trio, in 1915 
 Debussy: Sonate pour violon et piano, with Gaston Poulet, in 1917 
 Ravel: Le Tombeau de Couperin, by Marguerite Long, 11 April 1919
 Albert Roussel: Le Marchand de Sable qui passe, stage music, in 1919
 Augustin Barié: Symphonie pour orgue, by André Marchal, in 1922   
 Georges Enescu: String Quartet No. 1, French premiere 18 October 1921 
 Schönberg: Pierrot lunaire, French premiere by Darius Milhaud with Marya Freund, (on text translated by Jacques Benoist-Méchin), 12 January 1922
 Arthur Honegger: Roi David, French premiere 15 March 1924  
 Vierne: Pièces de Fantaisie by Marcel Dupré in 1926
 Guy Ropartz: Troisième Sonate pour violon et piano, French premiere by Georges Enescu violin and Marcel Ciampi piano, 21 April 1928
 Enescu: Troisième Sonate pour violon et piano dans le caractère populaire roumain, French premiere with Nicolae Caravia piano, 28 March 1927 
 Stravinsky: Concerto pour deux pianos solos, with the composer and his son Sviatoslav Soulima, 1935 
 Francis Poulenc: Telle Jour, telle Nuit song cycle based on poems by Paul Éluard, by Pierre Bernac, 3 February 1937
 Enescu: Troisième Sonate pour piano, by Marcel Ciampi, 6 December 1938 
 Messiaen: Vingt Regards sur l'enfant-Jésus, by Yvonne Loriod piano, 26 March 1944
 Duruflé: Requiem, by the Orchestre National de France directed by Roger Désormière with Camille Maurane and Hélène Bouvier, in 1947 
 Poulenc: Sonate pour violoncelle et piano, in 1949
 Pierre Schaeffer: Étude aux Objets, 30 June 1959 
 Jacques Castérède: Sonate pour piano, by Françoise Thinat, in 1967
 Laurent Petitgirard: Quintette avec piano, in 1977 
 Rodion Shchedrin: Bribes Russes  for cello (commissioned by the international Mstislav Rostropovitch competition, in 1990 
 Bruno Mantovani: Appel d'Air for flute and piano (commissioned by the international Jean-Pierre Rampal competition, in 2001
 Philippe Hersant: Concerto pour harpe et orchestre (Le Tombeau de Virgile) by Isabelle Moretti, in 2006 
 Thierry Pécou: Concerto pour piano et orchestre (L'Oiseau Innumérable), by Alexandre Tharaud, in 2006
  after the novel by Charles Dickens, in 2016

See also 
 Salle Pleyel

References

External links 

8th arrondissement of Paris
Concert halls in France
Buildings and structures in the 8th arrondissement of Paris
Event venues established in 1905
1905 establishments in France
Buildings and structures completed in 1905
Music venues in Paris